Jīngzhé, 惊蛰, is the 3rd of the 24 solar terms (節氣) in the traditional Chinese calendars.  It begins when the Sun reaches the celestial longitude of 345° and ends when it reaches the longitude of 360°. More often, it refers to the day when the Sun is exactly at a celestial longitude of 345°. In the Gregorian calendar, it usually begins around March 5 and ends around March 20.

The word 驚蟄 means the awakening of hibernating insects. 驚 is to startle and 蟄 means hibernating insects. Traditional Chinese folklore says that during Jingzhe, thunderstorms will wake up the hibernating insects, which implies that the weather is getting warmer.

Pentads 

Each solar term can be divided into 3 pentads (候). They are the first pentad (初候), the second pentad (次候), and the third pentad (末候): Pentads in Jingzhe are

 China
 First pentad:  (pīnyīn: Táo shǐ huá), 'The peaches begin to blossom'.
 Second  pentad:  (pīnyīn: Cāng gēng míng), 'Orioles sing clearly'.
 Last pentad:  (pīnyīn: Yīng huà wéi jiū), 'Eagles are transformed into doves'.

 Japan
 First pentad:  (Romanisation: Chitchū kei to), 'Awakening of hibernating insects'.
 Second pentad:  (Romanisation: Momo Hajime Emi), 'Peach trees start to bloom (smile)'.
 Last pentad:  (Romanisation: Na mushi-ka chō), 'Caterpillars become butterflies'.

Date and time

Related Topic
Villain hitting

Cultural References
Lim Giong has an 2005 album titled Insects Awaken.

Jingzhe_(film) is a 2004 Chinese film directed by Wang Quan'an.

References

03
Spring (season)
Chinese words and phrases